The 1937–38 Lafayette Leopards men's ice hockey season was the 2nd season of play for the program. The Leopards represented Lafayette College and were coached by Henry W. Clark and Dale H. Moore in their 2nd seasons.

Season
Just like the first season, Lafayette got a late start to the year and didn't play their first match until late February. Similarly, after losing their opening match, the Leopards won the second game against Lehigh at Skytop.

While there was enthusiasm from student body to keep the program going, the school decided against financially supporting the program and it was downgraded to unofficial status for the following year.

Roster

Standings

Schedule and results

|-
!colspan=12 style=";" | Regular Season

Scoring statistics

References

External links

Lafayette
Lafayette
Lafayette
Lafayette